The Capelle Schollevaar railway station, also known as Capelle Schollevaer, is a railway station in Capelle aan den IJssel, Netherlands, located on the Utrecht–Rotterdam railway between Rotterdam and Gouda. The railway station was opened in 1981 and has two platforms; it is located near to the "De Scholver" shopping mall.

Train services
The following services call at Capelle Schollevaar:
2x per hour local service (sprinter) Uitgeest - Amsterdam - Woerden - Rotterdam
2x per hour local service (sprinter) Rotterdam - Gouda Goverwelle

External links

NS website 
Dutch Public Transport journey planner 

Railway stations in South Holland
Railway stations opened in 1981
Capelle aan den IJssel